Hugo Ángel Velázquez (born 16 July 1992 in San Nicolás de los Arroyos) is an Argentine cyclist, who last rode for UCI Professional Continental team .

Major results
2014
 1st  Time trial, National Under-23 Road Championships
2016
 3rd Time trial, National Road Championships
2017
 1st Stage 1 Tour de Serbie

References

External links

1992 births
Living people
Argentine male cyclists
People from San Nicolás de los Arroyos
Sportspeople from Buenos Aires Province